Travis Kauffman (born August 21, 1985) is an American former professional boxer.

Background and amateur career
Kauffman was born and raised alongside his brother Jason, in Reading, Pennsylvania. Kauffman's father, Marshall, a former 7–1 amateur boxer who gave up a career to raise the boys, began training his sons from a young age. After taking some time off from the sport during his upbringing and being sent to local juvenile detention centers, Kauffman returned to an amateur career; at age 15 he won the Middle Atlantic tournament, then was selected for the 2001 junior Olympic team. Despite his mother passing away just a week before he was scheduled to compete, Kauffman finished third. Unfortunately, he had also neglected to inform his probation officer he was leaving the country and was disciplined for this on his return. At age 17, Kauffman made it to the semifinals of the 2003 National Golden Gloves Super Heavyweight tournament, where he was defeated by 23-year-old Travis Walker. Upon graduating high school, Kauffman attended Northern Michigan University on a full scholarship to box, but left the school after two months and won gold at the 2004 Police Athletic League national tournament. In 2005, Kauffman was undefeated in international tournaments, which include a finals win over 2000 Olympic bronze medalist Vugar Alakbarov, in a fight in which Kauffman fought southpaw due to an ailing right wrist. Kauffman also won a national silver medal in 2005.

Professional career
After compiling a 52–12 amateur record over four years and achieving the number one ranking, Kauffman made his professional debut in 2006. He won via second-round KO.

On December 5, 2008, Kauffman made his national TV debut with a third-round knockout (KO) of once-beaten Malachy Farrell (who outweighed Kauffman by 60 lb) on ShoBox: The New Generation. Kauffman followed up with a pair of early knockouts against clubfighters Cliff Couser and southpaw Livin Castillo.

In 2009, he was knocked out by Tony Grano. Kauffman asked Grano for a rematch but was turned down several times. He then fought Mike Miller, winning a shut-out unanimous decision (UD). Kauffman followed this up with a two-round knockout of Chris Koval and picked up the WBF intertitle.

This led to a promotional agreement with Empire Sports and Entertainment. Kauffman was released by Empire and then re-signed in 2012 with the same promoter using the name Greg Cohen Promotions.

Kauffman was then 21–1 with 16 KOs. On December 17, 2010, he fought Ross Thompson and won by DQ. He then fought Sean Williams, whom he knocked out in one round. Kauffman fought Charles Davis, winning a seven-round UD, as the fight was stopped due to rain. In February 2013, Kauffman vs Willie Perryman ended in a second-round knockout win that put Kauffman to 24–1, with 18 KOs. At that time, he was ranked 14th by the WBA.

Kauffman won an eight-round unanimous decision over Arron Lyons in August 2013. Then in September 2013 Kauffman beat Stacy Frazier in two short rounds, breaking Frazier's ribs, to move to 26–1, 19 KOs, and was ranked 10th by the WBA.

Kauffman fought Jason Barnett on November 30, 2013, breaking his ribs in the fight but earning a first-round knockout win and the WBU interim heavyweight title.

Kauffman took on Vincent Thompson on January 25, 2014, out-working him over ten rounds and winning the WBA federation title that became Kauffman's third minor belt. Kauffman is currently on a 10-fight win streak. Kauffman has started to work with trainer Nassim Richardson and has help from Al Cole, a former cruiserweight title holder.

A December 15, 2015 fight against world title challenger Chris Arreola was ruled a majority decision for Arreola but was later changed to no contest. Kauffman and a significant number of media outlets felt he had won the fight.

At Santander Arena, in his hometown of Reading, Pennsylvania on September 9, 2016, Kauffman scored a second-round TKO over Josh Gormley.

On March 17, 2017, Kauffman fought Amir Mansour in a Fight of the Year candidate, losing via split decision.

Kauffman then faced former interim WBA Heavyweight Champion Luis Ortiz, in his second fight since being handed his first professional defeat at the hands of Deontay Wilder. Kauffman was defeated via tenth-round TKO.

Personal life
Kauffman is a single father of three boys; Travis Jr., Christopher, and Jeremiah. Kauffman also adopted and raised two children who are now older, Julius and Neveah.

Kauffman's father Marshall, who is also his trainer, also trained former world champion Kermit Cintron.

In 2004, Kauffman was arrested after selling marijuana to an undercover police officer.

In 2008, Kauffman was charged with rape but was later acquitted, and in 2015, he received two years' probation after pleading guilty to charges of resisting arrest.

Professional boxing record

References

External links
 

1985 births
Living people
Boxers from Pennsylvania
Heavyweight boxers
Sportspeople from Reading, Pennsylvania
American male boxers